Park Su-Chang  (born 20 June 1989) is a South Korean footballer who plays as a midfielder for Gimpo Citizen FC in the K3 League, the third tier of professional football in South Korea. He has previously played for K League 1 clubs Daegu FC, Jeju United and Sangju Sangmu.

Club career
Born on 20 June 1989, Park was a draftee pick for Daegu FC from Kyung Hee University for the 2012 season. He made his professional debut on 19 May 2012, coming on as a substitute in a home game against Daejeon Citizen in the K League, the top tier of football in South Korea. For 2013, he switched to the second division K League Challenge, playing for Chungju Hummel, before returning to top tier football the following year with Jeju United, with which he played for two seasons. A two-year period at Sangju Sangmu FC followed. He later played for Daejeon Citizen FC in the K League 2 from 2018 to 2019 before transferring to Gimhae FC, a club participating in the K3 League, the third tier of professional football in South Korea. He switched mid-season to Gimpo Citizen FC, also in the K3 League.

Club career statistics

References

External links 

1989 births
Living people
Association football midfielders
South Korean footballers
Daegu FC players
Chungju Hummel FC players
Gimcheon Sangmu FC players
Daejeon Hana Citizen FC players
K League 1 players
K League 2 players